Laura Ramsey is an American film and television actress. She is best known for her roles in films such as 2006's She's the Man and The Covenant, 2008's The Ruins, 2009's Middle Men, 2011's Kill the Irishman, and 2013's Are You Here.

Personal life
Ramsey was born in Brandon, Wisconsin, the daughter of Jill and Mark Ramsey. She graduated from Laconia High School in Rosendale, Wisconsin, in 2001 and then attended Ripon College in Ripon, Wisconsin.

During her appearance on The Real Cancun, when asked how people in her town would describe her, she grinningly replied "naughty".

Career
Ramsey was spotted while working in a restaurant on Sunset Boulevard and got an audition the next day, for a role she won—The Real Cancun, a documentary that revolves around the true exploits of several American youths in Mexico She then began a role in ABC's television series, The Days before making her feature-film acting debut with Catherine Hardwicke's Lords of Dogtown. She returned to television and made a memorable appearance in an episode ("The Jet Set") of the AMC series Mad Men. In 2015, Ramsey starred as Becca Brady on the VH1 scripted series Hindsight. In 2023, after taking a eight-year hiatus from acting, Ramsey starred in Lifetime's television film A Rose for Her Grave: The Randy Roth Story that is loosely based on the book of the same name and true events.

Filmography

Film

Television

References

External links

21st-century American actresses
Actresses from Wisconsin
American film actresses
American television actresses
Living people
People from Brandon, Wisconsin
Ripon College (Wisconsin) alumni
Year of birth missing (living people)